Toby Saks (January 8, 1942 – August 1, 2013) was an American cellist, the founder of the Seattle Chamber Music Society and a member of the New York Philharmonic.

Music history
Born in New York City to an immigrant family, Saks began music lessons at the age of five, first on the piano and then, at age nine, on the cello. She studied at New York's High School of Performing Arts and later at the Juilliard School with Leonard Rose. She gave prize-winning performances at the International Tchaikovsky Competition in Moscow and the Casals Competition in Israel. In 1964, she won a Young Concert Artists's award.

In 1971, she joined the New York Philharmonic, one of the first women to do so. However, over the years, Saks grew to dislike playing in an orchestra and, in 1976, accepted a faculty position in the University of Washington's music department, where she replaced the retiring Eva Heinitz.

Seattle Chamber Music Society
In 1982, Saks averred that she missed performing publicly but at the same time observed that Seattle lacked a major outlet for the expression of "classical" music. Saks decided to correct that shortcoming and founded the Seattle Chamber Music Society, which has continued to host summer festivals that feature some forty artists every season. During her thirty-year career as artistic director of the Society, Saks hired some 266 artists, many of whom were housed by Saks and her immediate neighbors. In 2012 Saks chose her replacement. He was James Ehnes, a former festival artist.

Personal life
In the late 1960s, Saks married philosopher and author David Berlinski and had two children, daughter Claire (born 1968) and son Mischa (born 1973), both of whom are published authors. Saks and Berlinski later divorced.

In 2013, Saks was diagnosed with pancreatic cancer after persistent abdominal problems. Hoping to attend the Society's festival, she chose to forgo treatment and, on August 1, died at the age of 71. She is survived by her husband of 25 years, Martin Greene, and her two children.

References

1942 births
2013 deaths
American classical cellists
University of Washington faculty
Juilliard School alumni
Musicians from New York City
Deaths from pancreatic cancer
Deaths from cancer in Washington (state)
Fiorello H. LaGuardia High School alumni
Musicians from Seattle
Classical musicians from New York (state)
20th-century classical musicians
20th-century cellists
Berlinski family